The St. Thomas Celts are the athletic teams that represent the University of St. Thomas, located in Houston, Texas, in intercollegiate sports as a member of the Division III level of the National Collegiate Athletic Association (NCAA), primarily competing in the Southern Collegiate Athletic Conference (SCAC) as a provisional member since the 2019–20 academic year. The Celts previously competed in the Red River Athletic Conference (RRAC) at the National Association of Intercollegiate Athletics (NAIA) from 2011–12 to 2018–19; as well as an NAIA Independent within the Association of Independent Institutions (AII) from 2007–08 to 2010–11.

Varsity teams
UST competes in 16 intercollegiate varsity sports: Men's sports include baseball, basketball, cross country, golf, soccer, tennis and track & field; while women's sports include basketball, cross country, golf, soccer, softball, tennis, track & field and volleyball; and co-ed sports include cheerleading.

History
UST men's basketball dates back to the late 1940s. During their original athletic tenure, their mascot was the Warriors. Their men's basketball program disbanded in 1967. UST also hosted a baseball team from 1948 to 1969. Men's Basketball temporarily returned for the 1984–85 season, posting a 9–23 record and lost in the NAIA District IV (4) Tournament Semifinals, to Southwestern University. 1984 was also when the UST athletic teams were first known as the Celts.

In Fall 2006, the NAIA informed UST that its application to join had been accepted, bringing varsity intercollegiate athletics back to campus for the first time in 20 years. Beginning in 2007, UST fielded both a women's volleyball team and a men's soccer team to compete as an Independent within the AII. The 2009–10 academic year marked the inaugural season of the UST men's varsity basketball team. From 2011 to 2019, UST competed in the NAIA as members of the RRAC.

Move to NCAA Division III
On February 14, 2018, UST announced it would become the SCAC's 10th member after completing an exploratory year in NCAA Division III.  Pending acceptance into Division III after that, SCAC competition would begin in the 2019–20 season.  As Division III and the SCAC require a minimum of 12 sports, UST will add men's and women's tennis and baseball during the 2019–20 academic year. According to UST President Richard Ludwick, "[t]his is really recognition not only of the quality of our athletics program, but of the quality of our academics and institution as a whole. It is exciting to think about the level of competition that we have been invited to join."

The school became a provisional member of Division III in 2019.

See also
 List of college athletic programs by U.S. state

References

External links